Yazmin Aldwin Abdul Aziz (born 10 September 2001) is a Filipino-Malaysian singer-songwriter.

Education
Yazmin Aziz studied Speech and Drama at the Kuala Lumpur Performing Arts Centre. While a student she performed in a musical theater production. She speaks English, Tagalog, and Bahasa Malaysia. She completed her Diploma in Communication in May, 2021 and is currently studying Bachelor of Communication (Media Studies) (Hons) at HELP University.

Her early success in a talent competition lead to her pursuit of guitar and vocal performance. She has since ranked within the top three in several, including a Silver in vocal performance at the 2020 Virtual World Championship of Performing Arts, a Silver and Industry Awardee in vocal performance at the 2017 World Championship of Performing Arts in Long Beach, California, the 2019 Karaoke World Championship in Tokyo, Global Pinoy Idol, and Hurr.tv's Bakat Ohsem Malaysia.

Music career
Yazmin Aziz's first single Lihatlah was co-written with Vince Chong. She worked with M. Zukilfli on the lyrics, which she both sings and raps. The song was picked up by Warner Music for distribution.

Yazmin has had notable performances in Philippines and Malaysia including appearing on the national broadcast show ASAP Chillout singing music she wrote, along with the beatbox performance of Michael Pacquiao and has also charted nationally with her single Cold Rainy Days and Soul Connection on the Hitz Met10. Her other single “Paradise”, a collaboration with Filipino-American artist, Bobby Skyz, also charted on Rakita. 

Yazmin was also Hitz Artist of the Month: Homegrown for the month of November 2020.

Yazmin has collaborated with Filipino-American artists JayR and Kris Lawrence, as well as Libyan producer Debani.

Inspired by the pandemic, Yazmin released her latest song, Soul Connection

Yazmin was also a contestant on TV3 (Malaysian TV channel)'s Lagu Cinta Kita Season 2, a reality TV duet competition. 

Yazmin’s most recent song releases are produced and composed by Malaysia’s award-winning composer, Sharon Paul. These include “Bosan” and “Crush” which are both featured on TV3’s drama, Cinta Amnesia.  Yazmin is also the singer of “Kita Rockstar”, the official theme song for Mobile Legends Professional League 2022. 

Yazmin is currently a contestant competing on Astro’s Big Stage Season 4, a reality TV singing competition.

Works

 Kita Rockstar, 2022
 Crush, 2021
 Bosan, 2021
 Ruling Game, 2020 
 Soul Connection, 2020
 Cold Rainy Days, 2020 
 Heart & Soul, 2020 
 Lihatlah, 2018
 Pencuri Hati, 2022

Filmography

Film

References 
  

Filipino singer-songwriters
Malaysian  women singer-songwriters
21st-century Malaysian women singers
Living people
2001 births
People from Kuala Lumpur
Malaysian people of Malay descent
Malaysian people of Filipino descent